An informer, or informant, is a person who provides privileged information to an agency.

Informer may also refer to:

The Sub-Saharan Informer, a Pan-African weekly newspaper
Informer (newspaper), a Serbian daily
"Informer" (song), a 1992 song by Snow from 12 Inches of Snow
Common informer, a historical concept in English law abolished in 1951
The Informer (novel), a 1925 novel by Liam O'Flaherty
The Informers, a 1994 short story anthology
 Informer Computer Terminals, a defunct computer terminal company
The Washington Informer, an African-American weekly newspaper in Washington, D.C.

Film and television
 The Informer (1912 film), an American dramatic short directed by D. W. Griffith
 The Informer (1929 film), a British dramatic part-talkie directed by Arthur Robison, based on the Liam O'Flaherty novel
 The Informer (1935 film), an American drama by John Ford, also based on the Liam O'Flaherty novel
 The Informers (1963 film), a British crime film by Ken Annakin, released in the U.S. as Underworld Informers
 The Informer (TV series), a British series broadcast in 1966 and 1967 featuring Ian Hendry
The Informer (1980 film), a Hong Kong action drama from Shaw Brothers Studio
 The Informers (2008 film), an American ensemble drama by Gregor Jordan, based on the Bret Easton Ellis short stories
 Informer (TV series), a British series broadcast in 2018
 The Informer (2019 film), an American drama by Andrea Di Stefano

See also
 Informant (disambiguation)
 The Informant  (disambiguation)